The list of Estonian bandy champions starts as early as in 1916, when Estonias was a province in the Russian Empire, where bandy already was a popular sport. Just some years later, following the Russian revolution, Estonia became independent. The championship was held semi-regularly until 1953, from 1941 for the then Estonian SSR.

Estonian bandy champions 

BLTSK = Balti Laevastik Tallinn SK (Baltflot, Балтфлот).
Tallinna ÜENÜ = Ülemaaline Eesti Noorsoo Ühendus (Tallinna osakond)

Links 
 sporditulemused

Champions
Estonia
Bandy